The O. C. Barber Creamery, built in 1909, is an historic farm building located at 365 Portsmouth Avenue on the Anna-Dean Farm in Barberton, Ohio. It was built by American businessman and  industrialist Ohio Columbus Barber, the developer of both Barberton, which he envisioned as a planned industrial community, and the nearby 3,500-acre (14 km²) Anna-Dean Farm, which he envisioned as a prototype for modern agricultural enterprise. Barber was called America's Match King because of his controlling interest in the Diamond Match Company.

The Creamery was used to process and bottle the milk produced on the Anna-Dean Farm and to make ice cream, all of which was sold under the Anna Dean Farm brand name. Up to 10,000 pounds of milk were processed per day.

On May 22, 1973, it was added to the National Register of Historic Places.

History 
The O. C. Barber Creamery Company was founded in 1891 by Ohio Columbus Barber, who had made his fortune in the match industry. Barber had moved to Barberton, Ohio, and saw an opportunity to invest in the local dairy industry.

The creamery quickly became a success, due in part to Barber's innovative marketing techniques. He created a brand image for the creamery that emphasized its commitment to quality and freshness. He also established a network of local farmers to supply the creamery with fresh milk and cream.

By the early 1900s, the O. C. Barber Creamery Company was one of the largest dairy processing companies in the United States. It had a reputation for producing high-quality dairy products, especially its butter.

During World War I, the creamery supplied butter and other dairy products to the U.S. military. It also played a role in the war effort by producing a type of canned cheese that could be shipped overseas.

In the 1920s, the creamery expanded its operations to include ice cream production. It became known for its wide variety of flavors, including vanilla, chocolate, and strawberry.

The Great Depression had a significant impact on the O. C. Barber Creamery Company. The company struggled to stay afloat during the economic downturn, and Barber was forced to sell the creamery in 1934.

The creamery continued to operate under new ownership until the 1960s, when it was sold to the Borden Company. The Barberton location was eventually closed, and the creamery's operations were consolidated with other Borden facilities.

Legacy 
The O. C. Barber Creamery Company played an important role in the history of the dairy industry in the United States. It helped to establish the reputation of Ohio as a major dairy-producing state and set a standard for quality in dairy products.

Today, the former site of the O. C. Barber Creamery Company is home to the Barberton Industrial District, which includes a number of businesses and industries. The creamery's legacy is also preserved through the Barberton Historical Society, which has a collection of artifacts and documents related to the creamery's history.

See also
 List of Registered Historic Places in Summit County, Ohio

References

National Register of Historic Places in Summit County, Ohio
Industrial buildings and structures on the National Register of Historic Places in Ohio
Buildings and structures in Summit County, Ohio